G112 may refer to:
 China National Highway 112
 a painting of the William Rush and His Model series by Thomas Eakins